Events in the year 2012 in Hong Kong.

Incumbents
 Chief Executive: Donald Tsang (until 30 June); Leung Chun-ying (from 1 July)

Events

 29 February - Civic Passion was founded.
 April - Bonham Strand brand of bespoke tailored suits is founded.

See also 

 List of Hong Kong films of 2012

References

 
Years of the 21st century in Hong Kong
Hong Kong
Hong Kong